Mississippi Highway 9 (MS 9) in the Appalachian Foothills (aka North Central Hills) region of northeastern Mississippi, running north–south from MS 30 east of New Albany to MS 12 in Ackerman. MS 9W veers off to the left in a curve just about 2 miles north of Bruce. It goes north north-west until it merges with MS 7 just south of Oxford.

Route description

MS 9 begins in Choctaw County in Ackerman at an intersection with MS 12 just north of downtown. It heads north as a two-lane highway to leave Ackerman and pass through mostly woodlands, where it has intersections with MS 415 and MS 790, before passing by the TVA Ackerman Combined Cycle Plant (along with the Red Hills Power Plant and Mine). The highway passes through the community of Bywy, where it has an interchange with the Natchez Trace Parkway, before passing through a mix of farmland and wooded areas for several miles to cross the Big Black River into Webster County.

MS 9 immediately enters Eupora and has an interchange with US 82 before passing through a business district and neighborhoods to have an intersection with MS 182 in downtown. The highway passes north through more neighborhoods to pass by Whites Creek Lake before leaving Eupora and passing through rural areas for several miles. MS 9 travels through the village of Walthall, where it has an intersections with the MS 784 loop as well as MS 50, before traveling northwest through the community of Bellefontaine, where it has an intersection with MS 404, with MS 9 entering Calhoun County shortly thereafter.

MS 9 immediately passes through the village of Slate Springs before curving back to the northeast. It heads through flatlands for several miles to become concurrent with MS 8, as well as crossing Topashaw Creek and the Yalobusha River, before entering Calhoun City. The two highways split at a Traffic Circle in the center of town, with MS 8 splitting off along Veterans Avenue, and MS 9 continues north along Main Street to pass through some neighborhoods before leaving Calhoun City and winding its way through hilly terrain to travel through the village of Pittsboro before crossing the Skuna River into Bruce. MS 9 travels through industrial areas for a couple of miles before having an intersection with MS 32 in downtown. The highway now passes through some neighborhoods before leaving Bruce and having a Y-Intersection with MS 9W just north of town. MS 9 winds its way northward through a mix hilly terrain and flat farmland for several miles, where it has an intersection with MS 331, before passing through the community of Sarepta and crossing into Pontotoc County.

MS 9 curves to the northeast again as it travels through the communities of Randolph and Springville, where it has an intersection with MS 334, before passing through farmland, where it has an intersection with MS 341. The highway now enters Pontotoc and passes through neighborhoods, where it has an intersection with unsigned MS 770 (Spur Street) and becomes concurrent with MS 338 (W Oxford Street), before entering a business district. MS 9 has intersections with MS 15 and MS 336 (Turnpike Road) as it bypasses downtown along it western and northern sides. The highway now travels through neighborhoods, where it splits from MS 338 (E Oxford Street) and turns north along N Main Street at an intersection with MS 41 (N Main Street), before having an intersection with MS 345 (N Main Street) and passing through more rural areas. MS 9 leaves Pontotoc at an interchange with US 278/MS 6, where it widens to a four-lane divided expressway, and heads northeast through hilly areas to travel through the community of Endville. The highway enters Sherman after an intersection with Magnolia Way (unsigned MS 780), with the expressway end at an interchange with I-22/US 78 (Exit 76). The road continues into downtown Sherman as 3rd Avenue while MS 9 heads west along I-22/US 78 to cross into Union County.

MS 9 splits off the interstate at Exit 73B, near Toyota Motor Manufacturing Mississippi, heading north as a two-lane to immediately have an intersection with MS 178 before entering Blue Springs. The highway winds its way through town along Main Street, where it has an intersection with County Road 278 (CR 278, unsigned MS 764). MS 9 leaves Blue Springs and passes through hilly terrain for a few miles to enter farmland, where it has a long concurrency with MS 348 between the communities of Ellistown and Branyan. The highway travels through the community of Alpine before re-entering hilly terrain to have a junction with MS 370 before MS 9 comes to an end at an intersection with MS 30 at the community of Graham.

Major intersections

References

External links

009
Transportation in Choctaw County, Mississippi
Transportation in Webster County, Mississippi
Transportation in Calhoun County, Mississippi
Transportation in Pontotoc County, Oklahoma
Transportation in Union County, Mississippi